Ernst Nievergelt (23 March 1910 – 1 July 1999) was a cyclist from  Switzerland. He was born in Affoltern, Zurich, Switzerland, and died in Kappel am Albis.

In 1935 Nievergelt won the amateur standings in the Championship of Zurich.

He competed for Switzerland in the 1936 Summer Olympics held in Berlin, Germany in the individual road race event where he finished in third place.  He also teamed up with fellow countrymen Edgar Buchwalder and Kurt Ott to win the silver medal in the team road race, which ran over 100 kilometers on the AVUS-Nordschleife.

From 1937 to 1939 he competed in professional racing. In 1937 he took second place at Berlin. His only win as a professional was in 1938, when he won the ninth stage of the International Tour of Germany. At the Tour de Suisse, he finished on the sixth stage in second place in the standings and 19th place overall.

References
Pascal Sergent, Guy Crasset, Hervé Dauchy: Mondial Encyclopedie Cyclisme. Volume 2 GP published in 2000 by the UCI, 

 Ernst Nievergelt in the database of Radsportseiten.net

1910 births
1999 deaths
Swiss male cyclists
Olympic cyclists of Switzerland
Olympic silver medalists for Switzerland
Olympic bronze medalists for Switzerland
Cyclists at the 1936 Summer Olympics
Olympic medalists in cycling
People from Affoltern District
Medalists at the 1936 Summer Olympics
Sportspeople from the canton of Zürich